Hydrangea heteromalla is a species of flowering plant in the family Hydrangeaceae. It is commonly known as woolly hydrangea, Himalayan hydrangea or Chinese hydrangea and is native to the Himalayas and China. Average height is 10'-15' with inflorescences that are 5"-8" across and bloom May–June, full flowering only occurs in full sun. Leaves are elliptical or ovate and margins are slightly serrated. Is a very adaptable plant that is hardy to USDA zones (4)5-7. This plant is seldom seen in American gardens. There is a nice specimen at the Sir Harold Hillier Gardens. Hydrangea heteromalla is a deciduous shrub or small tree. Its native habitats include alpine forests and thickets in the Himalayas and China.

References

heteromalla
Flora of Assam (region)
Flora of South-Central China
Flora of East Himalaya
Flora of Nepal
Flora of Tibet
Flora of Vietnam